Earthsongs is the eighth album by Secret Garden. It was released in 2005 on Decca Records.

Track listing

Song notes
"Sleepsong" features artist Fionnuala Gill (Saoirse). "Grace" features Ole Edvard Antonsen on trumpet and piccolo-trumpet.

Lyrics for "Always There", "Sleepsong", "Half a World Away", and "Raise Your Voices" were written by Brendan Graham.  "Half a World Away" features vocals by Jan Werner Danielsen, and is a lyrical version of the instrumental opening track "Sometimes When It Rains".

Charts

References

2005 albums
Secret Garden (duo) albums